Suzanne Cory High School (abbreviated as SCHS) is a government-funded mixed-sex academically selective secondary day school located in , in the western region of Melbourne, Australia. The school caters for students from Year 9 to Year 12. Enrolment is offered to those having reached a high aptitude in the annual selective entry high schools entrance examination run by the Department of Education and Early Childhood Development.

Overview
The school was established in 2011 with two hundred inaugural Year 9 students. In 2014, the school, for the first time, accommodated a full cohort of eight hundred students, ranging from Years 9 to 12. It is one of three additional selective high schools in Victoria, alongside John Monash Science School and Nossal High School, that were established as the result of a government policy of expansion, increasing the number of fully selective government schools in Victoria. Prior to the addition of these schools, Mac.Robertson Girls' High School and Melbourne High School were the sole academic selective entry schools in Victoria.

Located in the suburb of Werribee, the school is in close proximity to Werribee Mercy Hospital and Hoppers Crossing railway station. Suzanne Cory High School is situated adjacent to Victoria University, giving students access to university facilities, programs, and academic staff.

The school is named in honour of the renowned Australian biologist, Professor Suzanne Cory. In tribute to Cory, the school logo depicts a gene strand, the aurantiacus, which was discovered by her.

Enrolment
Entry into selective schools is competitive. In 2011, exclusively 955 places were available for over 5000 applicants. Students in their second year of secondary schooling are applicable to sit a three hour long examination which measures aptitude in six component tests: numerical reasoning, verbal reasoning, reading comprehension, mathematics, creative writing, and analytical writing. The DET allows a maximum of five percent of Year 8 students from any given Australian school to be admitted into four selective schools: Mac.Robertson Girls' High School, Melbourne High School, Nossal High School, and Suzanne Cory High School. However, five percent of enrolments are filled through the Principal's Discretion Category. Students who are denied first round offers are given a chance to be seated in an interview. Over one hundred applicants are placed in this interview for less than twenty positions. In addition, the 'Equity Considerations policy', adapted by the DET allows ten percent of Year 9 enrolments to be filled through this manner. Students with Aboriginal or Torres Strait Islander backgrounds or students whose parents have a Commonwealth Health Care Card are eligible under this policy.

Academics

Curriculum
The design incorporates ICT arrangements for eLearning.

Year 9 and 10 courses are similar, with concentration on core subjects: English, mathematics, and science. Elective subjects are available to students throughout these years in which students can select from a variety of disciplines to undertake. Choices of electives include, but are not limited to: food technology, music, drama, media studies, and visual arts subjects. During these two years, studying a language is compulsory. The school offers three languages: French, Mandarin Chinese and Latin. Students select either French or Mandarin Chinese to study in these two years and have the option to continue study into VCE. Latin is offered from Year 10. In addition, classroom music is compulsory in Year 9, which allows students to develop a culturally informed understanding of Western Musical practices. Instrumental music is offered as an extracurricular activity.

VCE acceleration
The majority of students undertake VCE starting in Year 11. However, the school allows Year 11 students to voluntarily undertake a unit 3/4 VCE subject. This strategy is similar to the Select Entry Accelerated Learning one year early VCE plan, which enables students to become more prepared for VCE, with the intention to gain higher outcomes. In 2013, 178 of the school's 200 inaugural Year 11 students completed one or more unit 3/4 subjects.

Academic results
Many of the inaugural group of year twelve students completed unit 3/4 VCE studies in 2013. The median study score was 36 and the percentage of students attaining a study score of 40 or above was twenty-four percent. These first VCE results placed Suzanne Cory High School within the top twenty-five highest performing schools in the state in 2013.

Suzanne Cory High School was ranked sixth out of all state secondary schools in Victoria based on VCE results in 2018.

Student life

House system
All students at Suzanne Cory High School are allocated to one of four houses upon entry to the school. 
Each of the four houses is named after a mountain in the western region of Victoria. All the houses are associated with a colour, mascot, and badge.

 Blackwood  - Horse and knight motifs
 Cottrell  - Phoenix motif 
 Kororoit  - Dragon motif
 Rothwell  - Griffin motif

The house program involves a number of whole school competitions in several different domains including sports, debating, and music. This includes whole school events such as an athletics carnival, house chorals, and participation in charitable events such as the Relay for Life and World's Greatest Shave.
Students earn house points through the school values card system by demonstrating the school's prescribed values of respect, aspiration, and contribution. These are also earned by students in class, through co-curricular involvement, or outside of class.

Sports 
Within the school there are various sporting opportunities that students are encouraged to become involved in. Sport is a compulsory subject for Year 9 and 10 students, in addition to practical physical education requirements.

In addition to the sports program, whole school opportunities such as the school swimming and athletics carnivals are held in the first term. These events set a platform for the school's culture and application of the core values.  The school's house program is also used as a vehicle through lunch time sporting competitions where the students participate for their house in various team sports.

At the inter-school sport level, students participate in a wide range of sports against other schools in the Wyndham region. If successful, winning teams represent Wyndham against other schools in the Western Metropolitan Region.

Affiliations
Suzanne Cory High School is linked with the University of Melbourne and Victoria University, and students from Suzanne Cory sometimes are permitted to use facilities from the two universities.

Suzanne Cory High School also maintains its affiliations with the other selective schools in Victoria. Notably, the school has strong ties with Nossal High School. The relationship is unique in that the two schools are the only wholly selective co-educational high schools in Victoria. The schools engage annually in the Terry Bennett Cup, a friendly inter-school competition between year 9 students. The schools interchange each year to host the competition.

Staff
 Principal, Martha Goodridge-Kelly
 Assistant Principal, Luke Mandouit 
 Acting Assistant Principals, Laura Ruddick & Travis Hand
 70 teaching staff
 17 Non-teaching staff

Past principals

See also

 List of schools in Victoria, Australia
 Victorian Certificate of Education

References

External links
 School Website

Werribee, Victoria
Public high schools in Melbourne
2011 establishments in Australia
Educational institutions established in 2011
Selective schools in Victoria (Australia)
Schools in Wyndham